Helena Markson (1934–2012) was a British artist known for her work as a printmaker.

Markson was born in London in 1934. From 1952 to 1956 she attended the Central School of Arts and Crafts in London. In 1970 Markson moved to Israel. In Israel she taught art at the Bezalel Academy of Arts and Design, the Avni Institute of Art and Design and at the University of Haifa, at which she founded the university's printmaking studios. Her primary practice was etching and aquatint. During the 1950-1960s she exhibited her work in numerous exhibitions in London.

She died in Cambridge in 2012.

Collections
Examples of Markson's work are in the permanent collections of the Tate Museum, the Walker Art Gallery in Liverpool, and the Ben Uri Gallery & Museum.

References

1934 births
2012 deaths
20th-century British printmakers
21st-century British printmakers
20th-century English women artists
21st-century English women artists
Alumni of the Central School of Art and Design
Artists from London
Deaths in England
English printmakers